(born June 2, 1981) is a Japanese mixed martial artist currently competing in the Middleweight division. A professional competitor since 2006, he has fought for DREAM, Pancrase, DEEP, M-1 Global, ProElite, ONE FC, K-1, and also participated in the Dynamite!! 2010 event.

Background
Mizuno started competing in judo in high school, and currently holds a 3rd dan black belt in the discipline. On April 29, 2005, he became the champion of fifth Shooto East amateur mixed martial arts tournament, and on December 23, 2005, he took part in the U-FILE CAMP amateur tournament as member of Pankurasu geto.

On September 16, 2006, he defeated Yuji Sakuragi in his MMA debut at Pancrase: Blow 7. He fought against the likes Thiago Silva, Assuerio Silva and Mirko Cro Cop early on in his career.

DREAM
In 2010 Mizuno took part in the DREAM Light Heavyweight Grand Prix. He defeated Melvin Manhoef at DREAM 15, in the Light Heavyweight Grand Prix semifinal. In the final he fought with Gegard Mousasi, and lost to him by rear-naked choke submission.

Mizuno fought Sergei Kharitonov at DREAM's Dynamite!! 2010 New Year's Eve event and lost the fight via first-round KO.

On July 16, 2011, Mizuno defeated Trevor Prangley by KO (knee to the body) in the first round at Dream: Japan GP Final. Former UFC Middleweight Yushin Okami was present as his cornerman.

Post-DREAM
On January 21, 2012, Mizuno defeated Ilima Maiava via submission (arm-triangle choke) in the second round.

In June 2012, Mizuno faced MMA veteran Renato Sobral at ONE Fighting Championship: Destiny of Warriors. Mizuno lost via armbar submission in 31 seconds of the first round.

He then faced fellow judoka Jason Jones at Glory 2: Brussels on October 6, 2012 in Brussels, Belgium. He lost the fight by unanimous decision.

Mizuno returned to the One FC promotion on October 18, 2013 against Rafael Silva. Mizuno won a three-round unanimous decision.

In Mizuno's next bout, he faced undefeated Brazilian Leandro Ataides at ONE Fighting Championship: Rise of Heroes on May 2, 2014. Mizuno was stopped by strikes at 0:47 of round one.

Mizuno faced Brayan Rafiq at ONE Fighting Championship: Battle of the Lions on November 7, 2014. He won the fight via unanimous decision.

Mizuno then faced João Batista Yoshimura at DEEP 98 on November 1, 2020. He lost the fight via second-round knockout.

Mizuno made his first title defense attempt in a rematch against Yoshimura at DEEP 102 on July 4, 2021. He lost the bout via second-round knockout.

Mizuno faced Seigo Mizuguchi on December 12, 2021 at DEEP 105 Impact, winning the bout in the first round after soccer kicking Mizuguchi.

Mizuno returned a year later to face Masashi Inada at DEEP 111 Impact on December 11, 2022, winning 19 seconds into the bout after dropping Inada with a knee and finishing him with ground and pound.

Championships and Accomplishments
Deep
Deep Middleweight Championship (one time; former)
DREAM
2010 DREAM Light Heavyweight Grand Prix Runner Up

Mixed martial arts record

|-
| Win
| align=center| 25–14–1
| Masashi Inada
| TKO (knee and punches)
| DEEP 111 Impact
| 
| align=center|1
| align=center|0:19
| Tokyo, Japan
| 
|-
| Win
| align=center| 24–14–1
| Seigo Mizuguchi
| TKO (punch and soccer kick)
| DEEP 105 Impact
| 
| align=center| 1
| align=center| 1:15
| Tokyo, Japan
| 
|-
| Loss
| align=center| 23–14–1
| João Batista Yoshimura
| KO (punches)
| DEEP: 102 Impact
| 
| align=center| 2
| align=center| 0:32
| Tokyo, Japan
| 
|-
| Loss
| align=center| 23–13–1 
| João Batista Yoshimura
| TKO (punches)
| DEEP: 98 Impact
| 
| align=center| 2
| align=center| 4:40
| Tokyo, Japan
|
|-
| Win
| align=center| 23–12–1 
| Joshua Robison
| Submission (rear naked choke)
| DEEP 93 Impact
| 
| align=center| 2
| align=center| 3:28
| Tokyo, Japan
| Light Heavyweight bout
|-
| Win
| align=center| 22–12–1 
| Ryo Sakai
| Disqualification
| DEEP 92 Impact
| 
| align=center| 2
| align=center| 3:41
| Tokyo, Japan
| Light Heavyweight bout
|-
| Win
| align=center| 21–12–1 
| Mitsuyoshi Nakai
| Submission (head and arm choke)
| DEEP 90 Impact
| 
| align=center| 1
| align=center| 4:58
| Tokyo, Japan
|
|-
| Win
| align=center| 20–12–1 
| Ryuta Sakurai
| Submission (sleeper choke)
| DEEP 87 Impact
| 
| align=center| 2
| align=center| 2:53
| Tokyo, Japan
|
|-
| Win
| align=center| 19–12–1
| Lee Eun-Su
| Submission (rear naked choke)
| Road FC 049
| 
| align=center| 2
| align=center| 2:32
| Seoul, South Korea
|
|-
| Win
| align=center| 18–12–1
| Taisuke Okuno
| Submission (sleeper choke)
| DEEP 82 Impact
| 
| align=center| 3
| align=center| 4:34
| Tokyo, Japan
| Won vacant Deep Middleweight Championship
|-
| Win
| align=center| 17–12–1
| Genpei Hayashi
| Decision (unanimous)
| DEEP 79 Impact
| 
| align=center| 2
| align=center| 5:00
| Tokyo, Japan
| 
|-
| Win
| align=center| 16–12–1
| Jung Kyo Park
| Submission (rear naked choke)
| DEEP Cage Impact 2017
| 
| align=center| 2
| align=center| 1:55
| Tokyo, Japan
| 
|-
| Loss
| align=center| 15–12–1
| Gilberto Galvao
| Decision (unanimous)
| ONE FC 47: Unbreakable Warriors
| 
| align=center| 3
| align=center| 5:00
| Kuala Lumpur, Malaysia
| 
|-
| Win
| align=center| 15–11–1
| Mohamed Ali
| TKO (knee and punches)
| ONE FC 42: Ascent To Power
| 
| align=center| 2
| align=center| 3:52
| Kallang, Singapore
|Catchweight (209 lbs) bout.
|-
| Loss
| align=center| 14–11–1
| Jake Butler
| TKO (elbows)
| ONE FC 38: Clash of Heroes
| 
| align=center| 1
| align=center| 4:38
| Kuala Lumpur, Malaysia
|Light Heavyweight bout.
|-
| Win
| align=center| 14–10–1
| Jun Hee Moon
| TKO (retirement)
| DEEP 73 Impact
| 
| align=center| 2
| align=center| 5:00
| Tokyo, Japan
| 
|-
| Draw
| align=center| 13–10–1
| Young Choi
| Technical Draw
| DEEP: Cage Impact 2015
| 
| align=center| 1
| align=center| 5:00
| Tokyo, Japan
| 
|-
| Win
| align=center| 13–10
| Brayan Rafiq
| Decision (unanimous)
| ONE FC: Battle of the Lions
| 
| align=center| 3
| align=center| 5:00
| Kallang, Singapore
| 
|-
| Loss
| align=center| 12–10
| Leandro Ataides
| KO (punches)
| ONE FC: Rise of Heroes
| 
| align=center| 1
| align=center| 0:47
| Pasay, Philippines
| 
|-
| Win
| align=center| 12–9
| Rafael Silva
| Decision (unanimous)
| |ONE FC: Total Domination
| 
| align=center| 3
| align=center| 5:00
| Kallang, Singapore
| Middleweight debut.
|-
| Loss
| align=center| 11–9
| Jason Jones
| Decision (unanimous)
| Glory World Series: Glory 2
| 
| align=center| 3
| align=center| 5:00
| Brussels, Belgium
| 
|-
| Loss
| align=center| 11–8
| Renato Sobral
| Submission (armbar)
| ONE FC: Destiny of Warriors
| 
| align=center| 1
| align=center| 0:31
| Kuala Lumpur, Malaysia
| 
|-
|  Win
| align=center| 11–7
| Ilima Maiava
| Submission (arm-triangle choke)
| ProElite 3
| 
| align=center| 2
| align=center| 1:47
| Honolulu, Hawaii, United States
| 
|-
|  Win
| align=center| 10–7
| Trevor Prangley
| TKO (knee to the body)
| Dream: Japan GP Final
| 
| align=center| 1
| align=center| 4:41
| Tokyo, Japan
| 
|-
|  Loss
| align=center| 9–7
| Sergei Kharitonov
| KO (knee)
| Dynamite!! 2010
| 
| align=center| 1
| align=center| 1:25
| Saitama, Japan
| Heavyweight debut.
|-
|  Loss
| align=center| 9–6
| Gegard Mousasi
| Submission (rear-naked choke)
| DREAM 16
| 
| align=center| 1
| align=center| 6:10
| Nagoya, Japan
| DREAM Light Heavyweight GP Final; DREAM Light Heavyweight Championship.
|-
|  Win
| align=center| 9–5
| Melvin Manhoef
| Submission (kimura)
| DREAM 15
| 
| align=center| 1
| align=center| 7:38
| Saitama, Japan
| DREAM Light Heavyweight GP Semifinal.
|-
|  Win
| align=center| 8–5
| Ilir Latifi
| TKO (knee and punches)
| K-1: Rumble of the Kings
| 
| align=center| 3
| align=center| 0:15
| Stockholm, Sweden
| 
|-
|  Win
| align=center| 7–5
| Rafael Rodríguez
| Submission (rear-naked choke)
| M-1 Challenge 18: Netherlands Day Two
| 
| align=center| 1
| align=center| 2:20
| Hilversum, Netherlands
| 
|-
|  Loss
| align=center| 6–5
| Tom Blackledge
| Submission (rear-naked choke)
| M-1 Challenge 14: Japan
| 
| align=center| 1
| align=center| 3:22
| Tokyo, Japan
| 
|-
|  Win
| align=center| 6–4
| Jose Beltran Martinez
| TKO (punches)
| M-1 Challenge 8: USA
| 
| align=center| 1
| align=center| 1:53
| Kansas City, Missouri, United States
| 
|-
|  Loss
| align=center| 5–4
| Bruno Carvalho
| Decision (unanimous)
| M-1 Challenge 6: Korea
| 
| align=center| 2
| align=center| 5:00
| South Korea
| 
|-
|  Win
| align=center| 5–3
| Yoshiyuki Nakanishi
| KO (punches)
| M-1 Challenge 5: Japan
| 
| align=center| 1
| align=center| 4:13
| Tokyo, Japan
| 
|-
|  Loss
| align=center| 4–3
| Mirko Cro Cop
| TKO (punches)
| DREAM 1: Lightweight Grand Prix 2008 First Round
| 
| align=center| 1
| align=center| 0:56
| Saitama, Saitama, Japan
| 
|-
|  Win
| align=center| 4–2
| Masayuki Kono
| TKO (punches)
| Pancrase: Rising 9
| 
| align=center| 1
| align=center| 3:28
| Tokyo, Japan
| 
|-
|  Loss
| align=center| 3–2
| Assuerio Silva
| TKO (punches)
| Pancrase: Rising 5
| 
| align=center| 2
| align=center| 2:08
| Tokyo, Japan
| For vacant King of Pancrase Heavyweight Championship.
|-
|  Loss
| align=center| 3–1
| Thiago Silva
| KO (soccer kick)
| Pancrase: Rising 2
| 
| align=center| 1
| align=center| 4:29
| Tokyo, Japan
| 
|-
|  Win
| align=center| 3–0
| Yasuaki Miura
| Technical Submission (kimura)
| Pancrase: Blow 10
| 
| align=center| 1
| align=center| 1:47
| Tokyo, Japan
| 
|-
|  Win
| align=center| 2–0
| Yuji Sakuragi
| Submission (rear-naked choke)
| Pancrase: Blow 7
| 
| align=center| 2
| align=center| 3:20
| Tokyo, Japan
| 
|-
|  Win
| align=center| 1–0
| Keizo Nagaya
| Technical Submission (armbar)
| Pancrase: 2006 Neo-Blood Tournament Finals
| 
| align=center| 1
| align=center| 4:20
| Tokyo, Japan
|

References

External links
 

1981 births
Japanese male mixed martial artists
Light heavyweight mixed martial artists
Middleweight mixed martial artists
Mixed martial artists utilizing judo
Japanese male judoka
Sportspeople from Ibaraki Prefecture
Living people
Deep (mixed martial arts) champions